In Japanese mythology, the  is the descent of Amaterasu's grandson Ninigi-no-Mikoto from Heaven (Takamagahara) to Ashihara no Nakatsukuni; according to legend, the direct place of descent is at Takachiho-gawara in Japan. Following the tenson kōrin, Ninigi's son, Hoori, was born.

Three generations of Hyuga
After the Tenson Korin there were the Three Generations of Hyuga until Jimmu's Eastern Expedition when the Imperial House of Japan was founded.

References

Japanese mythology